Govindapur may refer to:
Govindapur, India
Govindapur, Dhanusa, Nepal
Govindapur, Parsa, Nepal
Govindapur, Morang, Nepal

See also
 Govindpur (disambiguation)
 Govindapura (disambiguation)
 Gobindpur (disambiguation)
 Gobindapur (disambiguation)